The 2010 NCAA Division III baseball tournament was played at the end of the 2010 NCAA Division III baseball season to determine the 35th national champion of college baseball at the NCAA Division III level. The tournament concluded with eight teams competing at Time Warner Cable Field at Fox Cities Stadium in Grand Chute, Wisconsin for the championship. Eight regional tournaments were held to determine the participants in the World Series. Regional tournaments were contested in double-elimination format, with four regions consisting of six teams, one consisting of seven, and three consisting of eight, for a total of 55 teams participating in the tournament, up from 54 in 2009.

Bids
The 55 competing teams were:

Regionals
Bold indicates winner.

New York Regional
Leo Pinckney Field at Falcon Park-Auburn, NY (Host: State University of New York at Cortland)

Midwest Regional
Prucha Field at James B. Miller Stadium-Whitewater, WI (Host: University of Wisconsin-Whitewater)

New England Regional
Eastern Baseball Stadium-Mansfield, CT (Host: Eastern Connecticut State University)

West Regional
Roy Helser Field and Jim Wright Stadium-McMinnville, OR (Host: Linfield College)

Mideast Regional
Don Schaly Field-Marietta, OH (Host: Marietta College)

Mid-Atlantic Regional
Samuel J. Plumeri, Sr. Field at Mercer County Waterfront Park-Trenton, NJ (Host: Kean University)

South Regional
Armstrong-Shelly Field-Fayetteville, NC (Host: Methodist University)

Central Regional
Brunner Field in the Duane R. Swanson Stadium-Rock Island, IL (Host: Augustana College)

World Series
Time Warner Cable Field at Fox Cities Stadium-Grand Chute, WI (Host: University of Wisconsin-Oshkosh/Lawrence University/Fox Cities Convention and Visitors Bureau)

References

NCAA Division III Baseball Tournament
2010 college baseball season